Mya-Lecia Naylor (6 November 2002 – 7 April 2019) was an English actress, model and singer, known for her roles as Fran in the CBBC series’ Millie Inbetween and Mya in Almost Never.

Early and personal life
Naylor was born on 6 November 2002 in Warwickshire, England to Zena and Martin Naylor. She lived in South Norwood in the London Borough of Croydon with her parents and three younger siblings, Ellis, Oscar and Angel Naylor. Ellis was also an actor. She was educated at Royal Russell School and Coloma Convent Girls' School.

Career
Naylor's first television role was in 2004 in Absolutely Fabulous as Jane. In 2011, she played Tati in Tati's Hotel and appeared in an episode of Cartoonito Tales as Little Red Riding Hood. In 2012, she appeared in two episodes of The Last Weekend. She then appeared in the film, Cloud Atlas as Miro.  She appeared in Code Red as Miriam in 2013, and Index Zero in 2014. From 2014 to 2018, she appeared in Millie Inbetween as Fran. In 2015, she played Samantha Reasonable in the radio play Mr Reasonable. In 2019, she played Mya in CBBC's musical drama, Almost Never.

Naylor was a member of the band Angels N' Bandits.

Death
Naylor was found hanging in a marquee at her home on 7 April 2019 by her mother  and was in cardiac arrest when emergency services were called to the address at 10:00am; Naylor was pronounced dead at 11:30am the same day at Croydon University Hospital. Naylor's father stated that his daughter "had not been her normal self" due to stress of her upcoming GCSEs and was also grounded and banned from attending a party; Naylor's father also added his belief "she was just making some sort of point" and "did not mean to do it", calling it "a silly spur of the moment thing." Croydon Coroner's Court investigated the cause of her death and in September 2019, assistant coroner Toby Watkin believed Naylor did not intend to end her life and ruled that Naylor's death was death by misadventure. A memorial service for Naylor was held at Our Lady of The Annunciation Catholic Church in Croydon on 19 May 2019.

Filmography

References

External links
 

2002 births
2019 deaths
21st-century British actresses
Accidental deaths in London
Actresses from London
Actresses from Warwickshire
Deaths by hanging
English child actresses
English child singers
English film actresses
English television actresses
People educated at Royal Russell School
People from South Norwood
British people of Jamaican descent
21st-century English women
21st-century English people